Dominican Republic competed at the 2016 Summer Olympics in Rio de Janeiro, Brazil, from 5 to 21 August 2016. This was the nation's fourteenth consecutive appearance at the Summer Olympics.

The Dominican Republic Olympic Committee sent a team of 29 athletes, 21 men and 8 women, to compete in eleven different sports at the Games. The nation's full roster was smaller by six athletes than in London 2012, and also featured its highest number of male participants in Olympic history since 1992. Among the sports represented by the nation's athletes, Dominican Republic made its Olympic debut in archery, road cycling, equestrian, and tennis.

Seven athletes from the Dominican Republic previously competed in London at the 2012 Olympics, including weightlifters Beatriz Pirón and Yuderqui Contreras, American-based freestyle swimmer Dorian McMenemy, and sprinter and former Youth Olympian Luguelín Santos, who earned a silver in the men's 400 metres. The lone returning medalist from the previous Games, Santos was selected to lead the Dominican Republic delegation as the flag bearer in the opening ceremony.

Dominican Republic left Rio de Janeiro with only a bronze medal, won by taekwondo fighter Luisito Pie in the men's flyweight category (58 kg). Several of the nation's athletes narrowly missed out of the podium in their respective sporting events, including Pirón (fourth, women's 48 kg), Contreras (sixth, women's 58 kg), fellow weightlifter Luis García (eighth, men's 56 kg), and half-lightweight judoka Wander Mateo (seventh, men's 66 kg).

Medalists

Archery

One archer from the Dominican Republic has qualified for the women's individual recurve at the Olympics by securing one of three available Olympic spots at the Pan American Qualification Tournament in Medellín, Colombia.

Athletics (track and field)

Dominican Republic athletes have so far achieved qualifying standards in the following athletics events (up to a maximum of 3 athletes in each event):

Track & road events
Men

Women

Field events

Boxing

Dominican Republic has entered two boxers to compete in each of the following weight classes into the Olympic boxing tournament. Leonel de los Santos had claimed his Olympic spot at the 2016 American Qualification Tournament in Buenos Aires, Argentina. Meanwhile, bantamweight boxer Héctor García secured an additional place on the Dominican Republic roster with his semifinal triumph at the 2016 APB and WSB Olympic Qualifier in Vargas, Venezuela.

Cycling

Road
Dominican Republic has qualified one rider in the men's Olympic road race by virtue of his individual ranking among the next two best ranked NOCs at the 2015 Pan American Championships, signifying the country's Olympic debut in the sport.

Equestrian
 

Dominican Republic has entered one dressage rider into the Olympic equestrian competition by virtue of a top finish from Central & South America in the individual FEI Olympic rankings, signifying the nation's Olympic debut in the sport.

Dressage

Judo

Dominican Republic has qualified one judoka for the men's half-lightweight category (66 kg) at the Games. Wander Mateo earned a continental quota spot from the Pan American region as Dominican Republic's top-ranked judoka outside of direct qualifying position in the IJF World Ranking List of 30 May 2016.

Shooting
 
Dominican Republic has qualified one shooter in the men's trap by virtue of his best finish at the American Continental Championships and other selection competitions, as long as he obtained a minimum qualifying score (MQS) by 31 March 2016.

Qualification Legend: Q = Qualify for the next round; q = Qualify for the bronze medal (shotgun)

Swimming

Dominican Republic has received a Universality invitation from FINA to send two swimmers (one male and one female) to the Olympics.

Taekwondo
 
Dominican Republic entered three athletes into the taekwondo competition at the Olympics. 2015 Pan American silver medalist Luis Pie, and newcomers Moisés Hernández and Katherine Rodríguez secured the spots each in the men's flyweight (58 kg), men's welterweight (80 kg), and women's heavyweight (+67 kg) category, respectively, by virtue of their top two finish at the 2016 Pan American Qualification Tournament in Aguascalientes, Mexico.

Tennis

Dominican Republic has entered one tennis player for the first time into the Olympic tournament. Víctor Estrella Burgos (world no. 78) qualified directly for the men's singles as one of the top 56 eligible players in the ATP World Rankings as of 6 June 2016.

Weightlifting
 
Weightlifters from the Dominican Republic have qualified two women's quota places for the Rio Olympics based on their combined team standing by points at the 2014 and 2015 IWF World Championships. A single men's Olympic spot had been added to the Dominican Republic roster by virtue of a top seven national finish at the 2016 Pan American Championships. The team must allocate these places to individual athletes by 20 June 2016.

See also
Dominican Republic at the 2015 Pan American Games
Dominican Republic at the 2016 Summer Paralympics

References

External links 
 

Nations at the 2016 Summer Olympics
2016
2016 in Dominican Republic sport